The Opawskie Mountains or Zlatohorská Highlands / Zlaté Hory Highlands (German: Zuckmanteler Bergland) are a mountain range of the Eastern Sudetes in the Czech Republic and Poland.

Location
The Opawskie Mountains stretch from northern Czech Silesia into Polish Upper Silesia, the eastern continuation of the Golden Mountains range. It borders on the Nízký Jeseník range in the south and the Hrubý Jeseník (High Ash Mountains) in the southwest. The Polish part of the range includes the protected area known as Opawskie Mountains Landscape Park. It is named after the Opava River with its source in the neighbouring Hrubý Jeseník range. The highest peak is Příčný vrch (975 meters above sea level).

Towns and villages

Poland

 Prudnik
 Głuchołazy
 Jarnołtówek
 Pokrzywna
 Łąka Prudnicka
 Moszczanka
 Trzebina
 Skrzypiec
 Dytmarów
 Krzyżkowice
 Dębowiec
 Opawica
 Lenarcice
 Krasne Pole
 Chomiąża
 Pietrowice
 Ciermięcice
 Pielgrzymów
 Dobieszów
 Gołuszowice
 Zopowy
 Zubrzyce
 Włodzienin
 Lewice
 Bliszczyce
 Branice

Czech Republic
 Jeseník
 Mikulovice
 Rejvíz
 Zlaté Hory

Mountain ranges of Poland
Sudetes
Mountain ranges of the Czech Republic